KOYN (93.9 FM) is a radio station broadcasting a country music format. Licensed to Paris, Texas, United States, the station serves the Paris, Texas area.  The station is currently owned by East Texas Broadcasting, Inc. and features programming from ABC Radio.

Air Staff
"The Caffeinated Country Morning Show with Ivy Lee" is on-air 6am to 10am Monday to Friday.

History
The station went on the air as KSMP on 1987-12-08.  On 1988-06-09, the station changed its call sign to the current KOYN.

References

https://web.archive.org/web/20120503055323/http://www.easttexasradio.com/koyn.php

External links

OYN
Radio stations established in 1987